The sixteenth season of the One Piece anime series was produced by Toei Animation, and directed by Hiroaki Miyamoto. The season began broadcasting in Japan on Fuji Television from January 6, 2013 to January 12, 2014. Like the rest of the series, it follows the adventures of Monkey D. Luffy and his Straw Hat Pirates. The first of twelve DVD compilations was released on January 8, 2014, with the last being released on June 4, 2014.

The story arc, called , adapts material from the end of the 66th volume to the end of the 70th volume of the manga by Eiichiro Oda. Having left Fishman Island, the Straw Hats recover a distress signal originating from Punk Hazard. There they discover Caesar Clown, an ex-Navy scientist, experimenting on children. Luffy and the prisoners team up to stop Caesar and his henchmen. "Caesar Retrieval" deals with the recently formed Heart-Hat alliance rescuing Caesar from a mysterious person in order to take down Doflamingo and Kaido.

Two pieces of theme music are used for the season. When the season originally aired "Hands Up!" was not used by Funimation in its simulcast due to licensing issues with the record label. These licensing issues were later resolved and Funimation restored the song for its original release.


Episode list

Home releases

Japanese

English
In North America, the season was recategorized as the majority of "Season Ten" for its DVD release by Funimation Entertainment. The Australian Season Ten sets were renamed Collection 48 through 50.

Notes

References
General

Specific

One Piece seasons
2013 Japanese television seasons
2014 Japanese television seasons
One Piece episodes